The Rompin District is a district located in the southeastern corner of Pahang, Malaysia. Rompin is currently under the Rompin District Council.

The district covers an area of 5,296 km and located 130 kilometres from Kuantan, the capital city of Pahang. It is bordered to the north by Pekan District, to the west by Bera District, to the south by the state of Johor, and to the east by the South China Sea.

The main town is Kuala Rompin and other town located in the district is Bandar Muadzam Shah. Main tourist attractions in Rompin is the island resort of Tioman Island.

Demographics

The following is based on Department of Statistics Malaysia 2010 census.

Administrative divisions

Rompin District is divided into 5 mukims, which are:
 Endau
 Keratong
 Rompin
 Pontian
 Tioman

Federal Parliament and State Assembly Seats 
List of Rompin district representatives in the Federal Parliament (Dewan Rakyat)

List of Rompin district representatives in the State Legislative Assembly of Pahang

Transportation

Land
Federal Route 3 is the main thoroughfare through this constituency. Southwards it goes all the way to Johor Bahru; northwards it leads first to the royal capital Pekan, then the state capital Kuantan, then through Kuala Terengganu and Kota Bharu. Federal Route 63 is another important route for the constituency; it begins at the junction with highway Federal Route 3 near Kuala Rompin, runs through Bandar Muadzam Shah before ending at Bukit Ibam.

Public transport
As with most of eastern Pahang, KTM Intercity does not serve Rompin. rapidKuantan buses also do not serve this constituency at this stage.

Prominent residents
 Jamaluddin Jarjis – former Ambassador of Malaysia to the United States, former Malaysian government minister, late Member of Parliament for Rompin.

See also
 Districts of Malaysia

References

External links 

Official website of Rompin District Council